Mangasoavina  is a town in Analamanga Region, in the  Central Highlands of Madagascar, located north from the capital of Antananarivo. The population is 5,384 by 2019.

References

Populated places in Analamanga